Dychlino  is a settlement in the administrative district of Gmina Wicko, within Lębork County, Pomeranian Voivodeship, in northern Poland.

References

Dychlino